The White Horse Inn (German: Im weißen Rößl) is a 1930 operetta set in Austria.

The White Horse Inn may also refer to:

Productions based on the operetta
 The White Horse Inn (Broadway version), from 1936
 The White Horse Inn (1926 film), a German silent comedy film
 The White Horse Inn (1935 film), a German musical film
 White Horse Inn (1948 film), an Argentinian film
 The White Horse Inn (1952 film), a West German musical film 
 The White Horse Inn (1960 film), an Austrian-West German musical film

Places
 White Horse Inn, Berrima, in New South Wales, Australia
 White Horse Inn (Oakland, California), U.S.
 White Horse Tavern, Cambridge, or White Horse Inn, an alleged meeting place for English Protestant reformers
 Old White Horse Inn, in Bingley, West Yorkshire, England

Other uses
 The White Horse Inn, a radio show hosted by Michael Horton

See also

 White horse (disambiguation)
 White Horse Tavern (disambiguation)
 White Horse Hotel (disambiguation)